Goat Island is part of Stonington, Connecticut in Wequetequock Cove.  It is just northeast of Elihu Island, and is also close to the coast along the Northeast Corridor. Sandy Point Island is nearby southwest along Little Narragansett Bay.

References

Coastal islands of Connecticut
Landforms of New London County, Connecticut
Stonington, Connecticut